Hopton Cangeford, also referred to as Hopton-in-the-Hole, is a small village and civil parish in south Shropshire, England.

The small parish includes Lesser Poston and Greater Poston; both were manors recorded in the Domesday Book of 1086 (Hopton Cangeford was not). They formed part of the Saxon hundred of Culvestan. They are situated to the north of Hopton Cangeford village.

Hopton Cangeford was historically an outlying part of Stanton Lacy parish. It belonged to (after the dissolution of Culvestan c. 1100) the hundred of Munslow.

The father of painter Charles Wellington Furse was the perpetual curate of the parish.

See also
Listed buildings in Hopton Cangeford

References

External links

Civil parishes in Shropshire
Villages in Shropshire